The Florida Youth Orchestra is a philharmonic orchestra for young musicians, ages 6 – 19. It was founded in 1988 by South Florida's first TV weatherman Bob Weaver. The orchestra has more than 400 members. Under the direction and guidance of its Music Director Thomas Sleeper, the FYO performs for thousands of concert-goers each year in addition to regular appearances on local and national television and radio broadcasts.

References

External links
 FYO website
 Sun Sentinel: Florida Youth Orchestra Members Present Holiday Celebration In Weston.

American youth orchestras
1988 establishments in Florida
Musical groups established in 1988
Orchestras based in Florida
Youth organizations based in Florida